Bridgetown Regional High School (BRHS) was a secondary school located in Bridgetown, Annapolis County, Nova Scotia, Canada. It served students from grades 6 to 12. In June 2017, the school closed, students from Bridgetown Regional High School and Bridgetown Regional Elementary School were moved into a new grade primary to 12 school, Bridgetown Regional Community School.

Bridgetown Regional Elementary and Lawrencetown Consolidated School fed into the secondary school at grade 6.

See also
 List of schools in Nova Scotia

External links
Bridgetown Regional High School

High schools in Nova Scotia
Schools in Annapolis County, Nova Scotia